Avalon Biddle (born 21 September 1992) is a motorcycle racer from New Zealand. In 2017, she competed in the Supersport 300 World Championship aboard a Kawasaki Ninja 300. In 2015 and 2016, she won the Women's European Junior Cup.

In 2011, she attempted to qualify for the 2011 Australian motorcycle Grand Prix in 125 cc but had engine issues. In 2015 & 2016, Biddle won the European Junior Cup European Women's Cup at World Superbike events.

Career statistics

By season

Races by year
(key)

References

External links
 Profile on motogp.com

1992 births
Living people
Sportspeople from Auckland
New Zealand motorcycle racers
125cc World Championship riders
Female motorcycle racers
Supersport 300 World Championship riders